Meroles ctenodactylus, also known as the giant desert lizard, Smith's sand lizard or Smith's desert lizard, is a species of sand-dwelling lizard in the family Lacertidae. It occurs in westernmost South Africa and western Namibia.

References

Meroles
Reptiles of South Africa
Reptiles of Namibia
Reptiles described in 1838
Taxa named by Andrew Smith (zoologist)